Trichaptum biforme is a species of poroid fungus in the order Hymenochaetales. It is a saprobe that decomposes hardwood stumps and logs. It is inedible.

References

External links

Fungi described in 1833
Fungi of North America
Hymenochaetales
Inedible fungi
Taxa named by Elias Magnus Fries